The 2012–13 Belgian Cup (also known as Cofidis Cup for sponsorship purposes) was the 58th season of the main knockout football competition in Belgium. It commenced on 25 July 2012 with the first matches of Round 1 and ended on 9 May 2013. Genk defeated Cercle Brugge 2–0 in the final, therefore qualifying for the play-off round of the 2013–14 UEFA Europa League.

Lokeren were the defending champions, but they were knocked out of the cup by Gent after losing out on penalty kicks in the round of 16.

Competition format
The competition consists of ten rounds. The first seven rounds are held as single-match elimination rounds. When tied after 90 minutes in the first three rounds, penalties are taken immediately. In rounds four to seven, when tied after 90 minutes first an extra time period of 30 minutes are played, then penalties are taken if still necessary. The quarter- and semifinals will be played over two legs, where the team winning on aggregate advances. The final will be played as a single match.

Teams enter the competition in different rounds, based upon their 2011–12 league affiliation. Teams from the fourth-level Promotion or lower began in Round 1. Third Division teams entered in Round 3, with Second Division teams joining in the following round. Teams from the Belgian First Division enter in Round 6.

Preliminary rounds
The starting five rounds featured only teams of lower divisions and all matches were played during the summer and early autumn, mostly in July and August. The Roman numeral in brackets denotes the tier in which each team plays. Teams with no numeral next to their name play in tiers 6 to 8.

Round 1
Round 1 matches were played on 25, 26, 28 and 29 July 2012, and included teams from tiers 4 to 8 in the Belgian league system. 

112 teams progressed to the next round, of which 53 came from the Promotion league (tier 4), 37 came from the top Provinciaal leagues (tier 5) and 22 came from the lower Provinicaal leagues (tiers 6 to 8).

Round 2
The matches were played on 3, 4 and 5 August 2012.

56 teams progressed to the third round, of which 32 came from the Promotion league (tier 4), 19 came from the top Provinciaal leagues (tier 5) and 5 came from the lower Provinciaal leagues (tiers 6 to 8).

Round 3
The matches were played on 11 and 12 August 2012. All of the teams in the Belgian Third Division entered at this stage, joining the 56 winning teams from the previous round.

At the end of this round, 46 teams progressed, of which 26 came from the Third Division, 14 came from the Promotion league (tier 4) and 6 came from the top Provinciaal leagues (tier 5) - all remaining teams from tiers 6 to 8 were eliminated in this round.

Round 4
The matches were played on 18 and 19 August 2012. All of the teams in the Belgian Second Division entered at this stage, joining the 46 winning teams from the previous round.

At the end of this round, 32 teams progressed to round 5, of which 14 came from the Second Division, 13 came from the Third Division, 3 came from the Promotion league and 2 came from the top Provinciaal leagues.

Round 5
The matches took place on 25 and 26 August 2012, between the 32 winning teams from round 4.

Of the 16 teams who progressed to round 6, 8 came from the Second Division and 8 came from the Third Division.

Final Stages

Bracket

Round 6
The draw for round 6 was made on 6 September 2012, and the matches took place on 25 and 26 September 2012. The 16 teams from the Belgian Pro League entered at this stage, and each will play one of the 16 winners from the previous round.

Round 7
The draw for round 7 was made on 1 October 2012, and the matches will take place on 27, 28 and 29 November 2012.

Quarterfinals
The draw for the quarterfinals took place together with the draw for round 7 on 1 October 2012. The matches will be played over two legs on 12 December 2012 (leg 1) and 16 January 2013 (leg 2).

First legs

Second legs

Semifinals
The matches will be played over two legs on 29 January 2013 (leg 1) and 2 March 2013 (leg 2).

First legs

Second legs

Final

See also
 2012–13 Belgian Pro League

References

External links
  

Belgian Cup seasons
Cup